Bandar Seri Bandi is a small town in Kemaman District, Terengganu, Malaysia.

References

Kemaman District
Towns in Terengganu